Abel Smith JP (30 December 1829 – 30 May 1898) was an English landowner of the Smith banking family and Conservative politician.

Smith was the son of Abel Smith and his wife Frances Anne Calvert. His father was MP for various constituencies, and his mother was the daughter of General Sir Harry Calvert.

Smith was elected Member of Parliament (MP) for Hertfordshire in 1854 but lost the seat in 1857. His father died in 1859 and he inherited the  estate of Woodhall Park, Hertfordshire, and various other properties. He was re-elected for Hertfordshire in 1859 and lost the seat again in 1865.

In 1866 he was elected for Hertfordshire again, holding the seat until the constituency was abolished in 1885. In 1885 he was elected MP for Hertford, and held the seat until his death. Smith was also lord of the manor of Rennesley and Justice of the Peace.

Smith married Lady Susan Emma Pelham, daughter of Henry Pelham, 3rd Earl of Chichester, on 7 April 1853. Their son Abel Henry Smith was subsequently MP for Hertford.

References

External links 
 

1829 births
1898 deaths
Conservative Party (UK) MPs for English constituencies
UK MPs 1852–1857
UK MPs 1859–1865
UK MPs 1865–1868
UK MPs 1868–1874
UK MPs 1874–1880
UK MPs 1880–1885
UK MPs 1885–1886
UK MPs 1886–1892
UK MPs 1892–1895
UK MPs 1895–1900
19th-century English landowners
Abel
Members of the Parliament of the United Kingdom for Hertfordshire